Kiwi Chow Kwun-wai (born 16 April 1979) is a Hong Kong filmmaker.

Career 
After his graduation, Kiwi Chow has participated in different process of film production including as continuity supervisor, editor and assistant director. Since 2005, he worked as a guest lecturer at the Hong Kong Academy for Performing Arts. In 2013, his first feature-length film "A Complicated Story" had its world premiere at the Hong Kong International Film Festival. His most successful and famous film "Ten Years" won the Best Film Award at the 35th Hong Kong Film Awards. He released his third feature-length film "Beyond the Dream" in 2020 and is one of the top ten films with the highest box office in Hong Kong that year.

In 2021, Chow's new film Revolution of Our Times, a  documentary  about 2019–2020 Hong Kong protest, was invited to be shown in the "Special Screening" section of the 2021 Cannes Film Festival. This film also won the Golden Horse Award for Best Documentary in 2021. However, the film is likely to be banned in HK as the new film censorship law was passed in October 2021, which give the chief secretary the power to revoke a film's licence if it is found to "endorse, support, glorify, encourage and incite activities that might endanger national security".

References

External links

1979 births
Living people
Hong Kong film directors
Hong Kong screenwriters